John Stuart Forrester (17 June 1924 – 24 November 2007) was a British Labour Party politician.

Early life and education
Forrester was born in Hanley, Stoke-on-Trent, and was educated at Eastwood School and the City School of Commerce in Stoke-on-Trent, and Alsager teacher training college in Cheshire.

Early career
He spent three and a half years in the Royal Navy and taught English to the Polish Resettlement Corps before becoming a teacher in the city. Partly as a consequence of his experience in the armed services, Forrester remained a "steadfast Atlanticist all his political life".

Political career
Having been secretary of the local Constituency Labour Party from 1961, Forrester was Member of Parliament for Stoke-on-Trent North from 1966 to 1987, when was deselected as Labour candidate and replaced by Joan Walley.

In 1970, he was appointed as parliamentary private secretary to David Ennals, the then Minister of State at the Department of Health and Social Security.

Forrester was a Stoke-on-Trent City councillor for East Valley, a ward that includes parts of Smallthorne, Sneyd Green, Milton and Baddeley Green, from 1973 to 2000 and served as chairman of the authority's licensing committee.

He was made Stoke-on-Trent's 50th honorary Freeman in 1992. He also served as a Magistrate in the city.

After Forrester's death, the Secretary of his local Labour Party Branch spoke of his "sense of duty, his commitment, his approachability, his warmth, and his humour".

References

1924 births
2007 deaths
Labour Party (UK) MPs for English constituencies
UK MPs 1966–1970
UK MPs 1970–1974
UK MPs 1974
UK MPs 1974–1979
UK MPs 1979–1983
UK MPs 1983–1987
People from Hanley, Staffordshire
Politicians from Staffordshire